Short Pump Town Center is an open-air shopping mall located in the Short Pump census-designated place (CDP) of unincorporated Henrico County, Virginia on West Broad Street (U.S. Route 250), approximately  west of I-64, exit 178A/B. This area of Henrico County is called The West End and is northwest of Richmond. Short Pump Town Center is home to many restaurants and stores including Macy's and Dillard's.

History and stores
Short Pump Town Center is a two-level, open-air retail center composed of upscale stores. It was opened on September 4, 2003 and has over 140 stores. The center is owned and operated by Queensland Investment Corporation.

In 2004, Circuit City opened outside the mall. After Circuit City went out of business in 2009, it was replaced by hhgregg. Hhgregg closed for good in 2017. This space is now occupied by Arhaus and The Container Store.

Anchor stores are Dick's Sporting Goods, Dillard's, and Macy's (originally Hecht's until 2006). The mall was also intended to have a Lord & Taylor as an additional anchor, until they pulled out from that plan after being repositioned.

On May 7, 2020, Nordstrom announced that they would be closing their location at the mall as part of a national downsizing resulting from the COVID-19 pandemic.

Surrounding area
Surrounding the mall, there are several strip malls, other stores, and restaurants within walking or short driving distance. These are on the Town Center property, however they are not a part of the mall itself. They are listed on the mall's store directory despite not being attached to the mall itself.

Rivalry with Stony Point
Following a disagreement with Taubman Centers on a possible mall development project, Stony Point Fashion Park was developed as a direct competitor and opened in 2003 in the same month as Short Pump Town Center. It is smaller but of the same upscale style as Short Pump Town Center. The mall was opened on September 17, 2003.

The Short Pump Express
The 'Short Pump Express' is a trackless train that connects points in Short Pump Town Center. Although marketed at children, the service is open to people of all ages. Service began in 2007. The trains are black or silver, with passengers carts either being dark green, red, or navy blue. The fare for the train is $3.00. The service also allows passengers to purchase 10-ride passes.

Notes

References

External links
Short Pump Town Center

Shopping malls in Richmond, Virginia
Forest City Realty Trust
Buildings and structures in Henrico County, Virginia
Tourist attractions in Henrico County, Virginia
Shopping malls established in 2003
2003 establishments in Virginia